John Penny (died 1520) was an English priest, successively Bishop of Bangor, 1504–1508, and Bishop of Carlisle, 1508–1520. He was also Prior to Bradley Priory 1503–1508.

His education is uncertain, though he may have been educated at Lincoln College, Oxford, and later received his LLD from the University of Cambridge. He served as Abbot of Leicester Abbey from 1496–1509 and in around 1500 built the boundary wall, Abbot Penny's Wall, which is now named after him. 

In 1520 Penny died at Leicester Abbey, where he had earlier been the abbot, and was buried at St Margaret's Church in Leicester. The church contains his alabaster effigy, although the rest of the tomb was replaced in 1846.

References

Alumni of Lincoln College, Oxford
Alumni of the University of Cambridge
Bishops of Bangor
Bishops of Carlisle
16th-century English bishops
Year of birth unknown
15th-century births
1520 deaths